Angela Harris may refer to:

 Angela Harris, Baroness Harris of Richmond (born 1944), British peer
 Angela P. Harris (born 1961), law professor at University of California, Davis School of Law
 Angela Harris (Coronation Street), fictional character in British TV soap opera Coronation Street
 Angela Harris (swimmer) (born 1967), Australian swimmer who competed at the 1984 Summer Olympics
 Angela Harris (singer) (born 1971), Canadian country singer
 Angie Akers (born 1976), née Harris, American beach volleyball player

See also
 Angela Harry (born 1963), American model and actress